Chris Bell (born November 6, 1976) is a former American Football offensive tackle who played in the National Football League with the Green Bay Packers and in the Arena Football League with the Toronto Phantoms, the Carolina Cobras, and the Georgia Force.  Bell played college football for the University of Cincinnati under head coach, Rick Minter.  Bell also attended Northmont High School in Clayton, OH.

References

Cincinnati Bearcats football players
1976 births
Living people
Players of American football from Dayton, Ohio
Green Bay Packers players